Apirat Kongsompong (born 23 March 1960) was the Commander in Chief of the Royal Thai Army from 1 October 2018 to 30 September 2020. He currently serves as the Vice-Chamberlain of the Royal Household Bureau and the deputy director of the Crown Property Bureau. He held many important positions throughout his career including chairman of the board of directors of Government Lottery Office, Independent Director at Bangchak Petroleum Public Co., Member of the National Legislative Assembly, Secretary of the National Council for Peace and Order, and member of the Senate.

Early life and education 
Apirat was born in Bangkok on 23 March 1960. He is the eldest son of General Sunthorn Kongsompong (the former Supreme Commander of the Royal Thai Armed Forces and the Chairman of the National Peacekeeping Council), and Colonel Khunying Orachorn Kongsompong. He has a younger brother, Major General Nattaporn Kongsompong (retired). Apirat completed his primary and part of secondary education at St. Gabriel's College. He later attended the Armed Forces Academies Preparatory School (Class 20) and went on to attend Chulachomklao Royal Military Academy (Class 31) where he graduated in 1985.

Ater that he studied a Master of Business Administration, Southeastern University Washington DC.,USA.

Military career 

General Apirat received a commission as an army officer upon graduation from Chulachomklao Royal Military Academy in 1985. He served as a pilot at the Army Aviation Center at the beginning of his military career. He completed UH-1H Maintenance/Test Pilot Training at Fort Eustis, Virginia, USA. He also completed the AH-1H (Cobra) Pilot Training Course at Fort Rucker, Alabama, USA. Apirat is also a graduate of Infantry Officer Advanced Course at Fort Benning, Georgia, USA. In October 1990, Apirat was appointed Assistant Logistics Officer at the Royal Thai Army Defense Attache Office in Washington D.C.

General Apirat commanded 2nd Battalion, 11th Infantry Regiment, King's Guard in Bangkok. He went on to command 11th Infantry Regiment King's Guard. He served as the Commanding General of 11th Infantry Division in Chachoengsao Province. He went on to serve as the Commanding General of 15th Military Circle in Petchaburi Province. Apirat commanded 1st Division, King's Guard in Bangkok. He was later appointed the Commanding General of 1st Corps in 2015. In 2016, General Apirat was appointed the Commanding General of the 1st Army Area. He was promoted to Assistant Commander in Chief of the Royal Thai Army in 2017. General Apirat was appointed the Commander in Chief of the Royal Thai Army in 2018 which he would command the Royal Thai Army until his retirement in September 2020.

Apirat's key staff assignments include Combat Intelligence Assistant Staff Officer, 1st Division, King's Guard; assistant director of Planning Section, 1st Corps; Civil Affairs Staff Officer, 1st Division, King's Guard; Chief of Staff, 11th Infantry Regiment, King's Guard; Executive Officer, 11th Infantry Regiment, King's Guard; Division Chief of Staff, 1st Division, King's Guard; Deputy Commanding General, 1st Division, King's Guard; and Deputy Commanding General, 1st Army Area.

Apirat's deployment experience includes anti-communist operations in 1986. He served as the Commander of Task Force 14 which conducted counter-insurgency operations in Yala Province in 2004.

Apirat is associated with the military clique Wong Thewan, in turn associated with the 1st Division, the King's Guard. While Prime Minister Prayut Chan-o-cha and his deputy, Prawit Wongsuwon are members of the rival 2nd Division clique, Burapha Phayak ('tigers of the east'), Apirat is known to have close ties with them.

Army chief 
Barely a month into his tenure as army chief, Apirat created a media firestorm with his comments on the necessity for military intervention in Thai politics should turmoil surface.

In October 2019, Gen. Apirat host the special sermon about propaganda in Thailand. As the National security officer, Gen. Apirat heavily concerned about digital propaganda via social media because of the hasty widespread the idea of communist or extreme left which is hard to identify.  Unfortunately, this mentioned idea is led to overthrow the monarchy which trend to influenced by protests in Hong Kong and define this operation as a “Hybrid Warfare” to destroy the foundation of the state.

In October 2019, Apriat warned in a speech to military officers, policemen, and uniformed students that, "Propaganda in Thailand is severe and worrying. There is a group of communists who still have ideas to overthrow the monarchy, to turn Thailand to communism..." His performance prompted the Bangkok Post to remark, "It was 'a lecture' that should never have been given by any army chief, for its combination of accusations against 'the left' and young people, and sensational and biased political messages." The speech prompted one analyst to urge that rival factions end the "enemy mindset". His comments sparked criticism online for being a partisan bureaucrat.

Gen. Apirat provided the urgent policy to detect and solve the difficulty on the welfare for the officer of Royal Thai Army.  Gen. Apirat founded the direct call centre for officers who has obstacles to provide confidential information to Commander in chief directly. Moreover, due to Nakhon Ratchasima shootings in 2020 caused by the welfare housing system, Gen. Apirat established the investigation committee to examine the source of obstacle and find the solution and to include provide remedy for the victim.  The hot line provided valuable evidence that lead to the undercover problem in Royal Thai Army, to be processed further by the specialist organization such as the office of the National Anti-Corruption Commission.

After Nakhon Ratchasima shootings in 2020, in which the perpetrator cited corruption in the army as motives, he as the army chief created an anonymous complaint hotline program on 17 February 2020. However, some media reported no concrete achievements. Later in April, an army sergeant filed a complaint about another corruption in the army via the program, but he was retaliated.

In July 2020, Sereepisuth Temeeyaves, a former police chief and leader of an opposition party Seree Ruam Thai, condemned Apirat's intervention in politics.

Other appointments

Political appointments 
After the coup d'état in 2014, General Apirat was appointed as Member of the National Legislative Assembly where he served in of the Foreign Affairs Committee and Local Government Commission.  When General Apirat took the office of the Commander in Chief of the Royal Thai Army in 2018, he was appointed the Secretary of the National Council for Peace and Order (NCPO). Following the general election in 2019, Gen Apirat was appointed to the Senate where he remained in office until his retirement from the military in 2020.

Civilian appointments 
Apart from military and political positions, General Apirat held several important positions in the government and private sectors. In 2000, he was appointed as a member of the Board of Directors of Expressway Authority of Thailand. In 2002, he was appointed to National Science and Technology Development Agency Governing Board.

In 2014, General Apirat was appointed to the board of directors of Bangchak Corporation as an independent director with authorized signature. In the following year, he was appointed as chairman of the board, board of directors of the Government Lottery Office. In the same year, he served as an advisor to the Office of Small and Medium Enterprises Promotion. General Apirat also served as a director on the board of directors of  TMBThanachart Bank Public Company Limited.

Royal careers 
General Apirat was retired from his military position on 30 September 2020. In the same year, His Majesty the King appointed General Apirat as the vice-chamberlain of the Royal Household Bureau and the deputy director of the Crown Property Bureau.

Personal life 
General Apirat is married to Associate Professor Dr. Kritika Kongsompong, a lecturer at SASIN (Chulalongkorn University) and the former host of the Weakest Link show on Channel 3 Thailand. They have a son, Major Pirapong Kongsompong, and a daughter, Captain Amarat Kongsompong (MD).

Awards and decorations

National honours
:
  Knight Grand Cordon (Special Class) of the Most Exalted Order of the White Elephant
  Knight Grand Cordon (Special Class) of the Most Noble Order of the Crown of Thailand
  Knight Grand Commander (Second Class, upper grade) of the Most Illustrious Order of Chula Chom Klao
  Freeman Safeguarding Medal - 2nd Class 2nd Cat
  Border Service Medal
  Recipient of the Chakra Mala Medal
  King Vajiralongkorn's Royal Cypher Medal 3rd

Foreign decorations 
:
2021 -  Commander of the Royal Order of Sahametrei
:
2020 -  Commander of the Legion of Merit
:
2020 -  Grand Knight of the Order of Sultan Ibrahim of Johor

References 

Living people
1960 births
Apirat Kongsompong
Apirat Kongsompong
Apirat Kongsompong
Apirat Kongsompong
Apirat Kongsompong
Apirat Kongsompong
Apirat Kongsompong